Salem's Baptist Church is a historic Baptist church located at 728 Court Street in downtown Evansville, Indiana. It was built in 1873, and is representative of Prairie School architecture.

It was listed on the National Register of Historic Places in 1982.

References

Baptist churches in Indiana
National Register of Historic Places in Evansville, Indiana
Prairie School architecture in Indiana
Churches completed in 1873
19th-century Baptist churches in the United States
Churches in Evansville, Indiana
Churches on the National Register of Historic Places in Indiana